Großbrembach is a village and a former municipality in the state of Thuringia, Germany. It is part of the district Sömmerda. Since 1 January 2019, it is part of the municipality Buttstädt.

References

Sömmerda (district)
Grand Duchy of Saxe-Weimar-Eisenach
Former municipalities in Thuringia